is a principle local road that stretches from Shinjuku, Tokyo to Tokorozawa, Saitama. Most of the sections are located in Tokyo.

Route description
The Tokyo and Saitama sections of the road have a length of 24,870 and 4,329 m respectively.

References

Roads in Tokyo
Roads in Saitama Prefecture
Prefectural roads in Japan